Henry Joy may refer to:

 Henry Joy McCracken (1767–1798), Irish republican
 Henry Bourne Joy (1864–1936), American entrepreneur & activist
 Henry L. Joy (born 1933), American educator, activist, & politician
 Henry Joy (judge) (1767–1838), Irish judge